Patrick Grant (1795−14 May 1855) was an English businessman who was an Australian politician and Police Magistrate. He was the proprietor of the Sun, the True Sun.

Biography
Grant was the eldest son of Lieutenant Colonel Alexander Grant and Jane Hannay.

Politician Henry Hunt brought a libel action against Grant, the True Sun's proprietor, publisher John Bell, and printer John Ager for an article published on 18 December 1832; however, Hunt was awarded damages of one farthing. Grant, Bell and Ager were prosecuted, convicted and confined in 1834 to the King's Bench Prison for advocating tax resistance against the British government's window tax. He was later pardoned.

He was a police magistrate at Maitland, in the Hunter Valley and sub editor of the Sydney Gazette. In 1845 he was elected to the New South Wales Legislative Council; this election was voided, but he was re-elected later that year and served until 1848.

Marriage and issue
Patrick was married to Catherine Sophia Grant, the daughter of Charles Grant and Jane Fraser, they are known to have had the following known issue:
Alexander Ronald Grant, Canon of Ely
Robert Grant
Charles Grant (died 1876)
Julia Grant
Matilda Grant
Flora Sophia Grant

References

 

Members of the New South Wales Legislative Council
1795 births
1855 deaths
19th-century Australian politicians